Qarasüleymanlı (also, Karasuleymanly) is a village in the Goranboy Rayon of Azerbaijan.  The village forms part of the municipality of Goranboy.

Notable natives 

 Mammad Hasanov — National Hero of Azerbaijan.

References 

Populated places in Goranboy District